Khaniman (also Romanized as Khānīman; also known as Khānemān) is a city in Kamfiruz-e Shomali Rural District, Kamfiruz District, Marvdasht County, Fars Province, Iran. At the 2006 census, its population was 3,498, in 917 families.

References 

Populated places in Marvdasht County
Cities in Fars Province